Richard N. Frank (May 5, 1923May 20, 2015) was an American businessperson and restaurateur. He was the owner of Lawry's Restaurants and created the Lawry's Beef Bowl contest in 1956.

Early life
Frank graduated from Pomona College in 1946.

Career

Legacy
Frank Dining Hall, the main dining hall for Pomona's South Campus, is named after him.

References

American businesspeople
Pomona College alumni
Pomona College trustees
1923 births
2015 deaths